This list of mammals of Colorado includes every wild mammal species seen in the U.S. state of Colorado, based on the list published by the Colorado Division of Wildlife.
It does not include species found only in captivity. Species in this list are grouped by order and then by family within each order. The common name for each species is followed by its binomial name.

The following codes are used to designate some species:
EN - Species is listed as endangered by the IUCN.
NT - Species is listed as near threatened by the IUCN.

Didelphimorphia

Opossums

Order: DidelphimorphiaFamily: Didelphidae

Virginia opossum, Didelphis virginiana

Cingulata

Armadillos
 
Order: CingulataFamily: Dasypodidae

Nine-banded armadillo, Dasypus novemcinctus

Rodentia

Beavers

Order: RodentiaFamily: Castoridae

North American beaver, Castor canadensis

Pocket gophers
Order: RodentiaFamily: Geomyidae

Yellow-faced pocket gopher, Cratogeomys castanops
Plains pocket gopher, Geomys bursarius
Botta's pocket gopher, Thomomys bottae
Northern pocket gopher, Thomomys talpoides

Kangaroo rats, pocket mice
Order: RodentiaFamily: Heteromyidae

Hispid pocket mouse, Chaetodipus hispidus
Ord's kangaroo rat, Dipodomys ordii
Olive-backed pocket mouse, Perognathus fasciatus
Plains pocket mouse, Perognathus flavescens
Silky pocket mouse, Perognathus flavus
Great Basin pocket mouse, Perognathus merriami

New World porcupines

Order: RodentiaFamily: Erethizontidae

North American porcupine, Erethizon dorsatum

Jumping mice
Order: RodentiaFamily: Dipodidae

Meadow jumping mouse, Zapus hudsonius
Western jumping mouse, Zapus princeps

New World rats, New World mice, voles
Order: RodentiaFamily: Cricetidae

Sagebrush vole, Lemmiscus curtatus
Long-tailed vole, Microtus longicaudus
Mexican vole, Microtus mexicanus
Montane vole, Microtus montanus
Prairie vole, Microtus ochrogaster
Meadow vole, Microtus pennsylvanicus
Southern red-backed vole, Myodes gapperii
White-throated woodrat, Neotoma albigula
Bushy-tailed woodrat, Neotoma cinerea
Eastern woodrat, Neotoma floridana
Desert woodrat, Neotoma lepida
Mexican woodrat, Neotoma mexicana
Southern plains woodrat, Neotoma micropus
Muskrat, Ondatra zibethicus
Northern grasshopper mouse, Onychomys leucogaster
Brush mouse, Peromyscus boylii
Canyon mouse, Peromyscus crinitus
White-footed mouse, Peromyscus leucopus
Northern rock mouse, Peromyscus nasutus
Western deer mouse, Peromyscus sonoriensis
Pinyon mouse, Peromyscus truei
Western heather vole, Phenacomys intermedius
Western harvest mouse, Reithrodontomys megalotis
Plains harvest mouse, Reithrodontomys montanus
Hispid cotton rat, Sigmodon hispidus

Chipmunks, marmots, squirrels
Order: RodentiaFamily: Sciuridae

White-tailed antelope squirrel, Ammospermophilus leucurus
Golden-mantled ground squirrel, Callospermophilus lateralis
Gunnison's prairie dog, Cynomys gunnisoni
White-tailed prairie dog, Cynomys leucurus
Black-tailed prairie dog, Cynomys ludovicianus
Northern flying squirrel, Glaucomys sabrinus
Thirteen-lined ground squirrel, Ictodomys tridecemlineatus
Yellow-bellied marmot, Marmota flaviventris
Cliff chipmunk, Neotamias dorsalis
Least chipmunk, Neotamias minimus
Colorado chipmunk, Neotamias quadrivittatus
Hopi chipmunk, Neotamias rufus
Uinta chipmunk, Neotamias umbrinus
Rock squirrel, Otospermophilus variegatus
Abert's squirrel, Sciurus aberti
Fox squirrel, Sciurus niger
Southwestern red squirrel, Tamiasciurus fremonti
American red squirrel, Tamiasciurus hudsonicus
Wyoming ground squirrel, Urocitellus elegans
Spotted ground squirrel, Xerospermophilus spilosoma

Lagomorpha

Pikas

Order: LagomorphaFamily: Ochotonidae

American pika, Ochotona princeps

Hares, rabbits
 
Order: LagomorphaFamily: Leporidae

Pygmy rabbit, Brachylagus idahodensis
Snowshoe hare, Lepus americanus
Black-tailed jackrabbit, Lepus californicus
White-tailed jackrabbit, Lepus townsendii
Desert cottontail, Sylvilagus audubonii
Eastern cottontail, Sylvilagus floridanus
Mountain cottontail, Sylvilagus nuttallii

Eulipotyphla

Shrews
Order: EulipotyphlaFamily: Soricidae

Elliot's short-tailed shrew, Blarina hylophaga
North American least shrew, Cryptotis parva
Crawford's gray shrew, Notiosorex crawfordi
Cinereus shrew, Sorex cinereus
American pygmy shrew, Sorex hoyi
Merriam's shrew, Sorex merriami
Montane shrew, Sorex monticolus
Dwarf shrew, Sorex nanus
American water shrew, Sorex palustris

Moles
Order: EulipotyphlaFamily: Talpidae

Eastern mole, Scalopus aquaticus

Chiroptera

Vesper bats
Order: ChiropteraFamily: Vespertilionidae

Silver-haired bat, Lasionycteris noctivagans
California myotis, Myotis californicus
Western small-footed myotis, Myotis ciliolabrum
Long-eared myotis, Myotis evotis
Little brown bat, Myotis lucifugus
Fringed myotis, Myotis thysanodes
Long-legged myotis, Myotis volans
Yuma myotis, Myotis yumanensis
Pallid bat, Antrozous pallidus
Big brown bat, Eptesicus fuscus
Spotted bat, Euderma maculatum
Eastern red bat, Lasiurus borealis
Hoary bat, Lasiurus cinereus
Western pipistrelle, Parastrellus hesperus
Townsend's big-eared bat, Corynorhinus townsendii

Free-tailed bats
Order: ChiropteraFamily: Molossidae

Big free-tailed bat, Nyctinomops macrotis
Mexican free-tailed bat, Tadarida brasiliensis

Carnivora

Cats

Order: CarnivoraFamily: Felidae

Canada lynx, Lynx canadensis reintroduced
Bobcat, Lynx rufus

Cougar, Puma concolor

Canids

Order: CarnivoraFamily: Canidae

Coyote, Canis latrans
Gray wolf, Canis lupus reintroduced
Great Plains wolf, C. l. nubilus extinct
Northwestern wolf, C. l. occidentalis 
Southern Rocky Mountain wolf, C. l. youngi extinct
Gray fox, Urocyon cinereoargenteus
Kit fox, Vulpes macrotis
Swift fox, Vulpes velox
Red fox, Vulpes vulpes

Bears
Order: CarnivoraFamily: Ursidae

American black bear, Ursus americanus
Brown bear, Ursus arctos extirpated
Grizzly bear, U. a. horribilis extirpated

Skunks
Order: CarnivoraFamily: Mephitidae

American hog-nosed skunk, Conepatus leuconotus
Striped skunk, Mephitis mephitis
Western spotted skunk, Spilogale gracilis
Eastern spotted skunk, Spilogale putorius

Weasels
 
 

Order: CarnivoraFamily: Mustelidae

Wolverine, Gulo gulo extirpated
North American river otter, Lontra canadensis
Pacific marten, Martes caurina
Black-footed ferret, Mustela nigripes reintroduced
American ermine, Mustela richardsonii
Long-tailed weasel, Neogale frenata
American mink, Neogale vison
American badger, Taxidea taxus

Procyonids

Order: CarnivoraFamily: Procyonidae

Ringtail, Bassariscus astutus
Raccoon, Procyon lotor

Artiodactyla

Pronghorns
Order: ArtiodactylaFamily: Antilocapridae

Pronghorn, Antilocapra americana

Deer

Order: ArtiodactylaFamily: Cervidae

Moose, Alces alces
Elk, Cervus canadensis
Mule deer, Odocoileus hemionus
White-tailed deer, Odocoileus virginianus

Bovids

Order: ArtiodactylaFamily: Bovidae

American bison, Bison bison reintroduced
Mountain goat, Oreamnos americanus introduced
Bighorn sheep, Ovis canadensis

See also
List of chordate orders
List of regional mammals lists
Mammal classification

References

Mammal Diversity Database

Colorado
Mammals